Values And Virtues is an EP by former Dum Dums vocalist Josh Doyle.

Track listing
"High School Soldier" - 3:50
"Ghosts Like You" - 4:18
"Pop Idol" - 2:55
"Waiting For The Payoff" - 4:46
"Concrete Moon" - 4:03

Middletown Bonus Tracks
"Middletown" - 3:24
"Two Lines Instead Of One" - 3:36
"This Transcendant Ache" - 3:25
"My Jerusalem" - 3:53
"Waiting For The Payoff (Acoustic)" - 4:18
"Jericho" - 3:24
"Damaged Goods" - 4:17
"Army Of Two (Acoustic)" - 4:08
"Concrete Moon (Acoustic)" - 4:56

Credits
 Written by Josh Doyle
 Track 2, 4 & 5 produced by Justin Saunders
 Track 1 & 3 produced and mixed by Joe Baldridge
 Track 2, 4 & 5 mixed by John Castelli
 Mastered by Steve Wilson
 Artwork & design by Shaun Gordon
 Vocals & guitar by Josh Doyle
 Additional guitars by Mark Hamilton, Justin Saunders & Jason Moore
 Bass by Jordan Hester, Beau Burtnick, Tony Lucido & Josh Fink
 Drums by Paul Evans, Doy Gardner & Joshua Moore
 Backing vocals by Jason Moore
 Cello by Justin Saunders

References

Josh Doyle albums
2009 EPs